NAHT is a trade union and professional association representing more than 45,000 members in England, Wales and Northern Ireland. Members hold leadership positions in early years; primary; special and secondary schools; independent schools; sixth form and FE colleges; outdoor education centres; pupil referral units, social services establishments and other educational settings.

The union was founded in 1897 as the National Federation of Head Teachers' Associations.  Membership grew from just over 1,000 in 1898 to 10,000 in 1947, and 20,000 by the 1980s.  For many years, membership was restricted to headteachers, but deputy headteachers were admitted from 1985, and assistant headteachers from 2000.

General Secretaries
1897: J. Edwards
1901: E. F. Farthing
c.1915: Dougherty
c.1921: Jackson
1928: R. J. Shambrook
1930: Thomas Tibbey
1934
1966: Robert Cook
1978: David Hart
2005: Mick Brookes
2010: Russell Hobby
2017 Paul Whiteman

References

External links
NAHT website

Education trade unions
Trade unions in the United Kingdom
1897 establishments in the United Kingdom
Organizations established in 1897
Trade unions based in West Sussex
Trade unions affiliated with the Trades Union Congress